Barwell Athletic F.C. was an English association football club based in Barwell, England.

History
The club entered the FA Cup on four occasions, but never went further than the 1st Qualifying Round.

In 1992 they merged with Hinckley F.C. to form Barwell F.C.

References

Defunct football clubs in Leicestershire
Association football clubs disestablished in 1992
1992 disestablishments in England